Pseudolusitanops is an extinct genus of sea snails, marine gastropod mollusks in the family Raphitomidae.

Description

Species
Species within the genus Pseudolusitanops include:
 † Pseudolusitanops bulbiformis (Lozouet, 1999)

References

 Lozouet P. (2017). Les Conoidea de l'Oligocène supérieur (Chattien) du bassin de l'Adour (Sud-Ouest de la France). Cossmanniana. 19: 3–180.

 
Raphitomidae